The Guyana men's national field hockey team represents Guyana in men's international field hockey competitions. The team is controlled by the Guyana Hockey Board, the governing body for field hockey in Guyana.

Tournament record

Pan American Games
1971 – 8th place
1975 – 7th place
1991 – 10th place

Central American and Caribbean Games
 1993 – 5th place
 2018 – 4th place
 2023 – Qualified

Pan American Challenge
2015 – 4th place

Alba Games
 2007 –

See also
Guyana women's national field hockey team

References

National team
Americas men's national field hockey teams
Field hockey